There are over 330 species in the genus Netelia.

Species (335)

Subgenus Amebachia 
 Netelia baibarana Uchida, 1928
 Netelia fulvistigma Konishi, 2010
 Netelia laevis (Cameron, 1905) c g
 Netelia rasilella Konishi, 2010
 Netelia vicinalis Konishi, 2010
 Netelia yoshimatsui Konishi, 2010

Subgenus Apatagium 
 Netelia coreana (Uchida, 1928)
 Netelia dayaoshanensis He & Chen, 1996 c g
 Netelia harmani Gauld, 1983 c g
 Netelia inaequalis (Uchida, 1934) c g
 Netelia labi Gauld, 1983 c g
 Netelia longicauda Konishi, 1986 c g
 Netelia macrostigma (Enderlein, 1912) c g
 Netelia obesis Gauld, 1983 c g
 Netelia okinawana Konishi, 1996 c g
 Netelia pagoni Gauld, 1983 c g
 Netelia retaki Gauld, 1983 c g
 Netelia smithii (Dalla Torre, 1901) c b
 Netelia tristrigata (Enderlein, 1912) c g
 Netelia vulgaris Konishi, 1986 c g
 Netelia zhejiangensis He & Chen, 1996 c g

Subgenus Bessobates 
 Netelia comitor Tolkanitz, 1974 c g
 Netelia coreensis Cha & Lee, 1988 c g
 Netelia cristata (Thomson, 1888) c g
 Netelia deceptor (Morley, 1913) c g b
 Netelia frankii (Brauns, 1889) c g
 Netelia frenata Tolkanitz, 1981 c g
 Netelia gansuana (Kokujev, 1906) c
 Netelia kiuhabona (Uchida, 1928) c g
 Netelia latungula (Thomson, 1888) c g b
 Netelia longipad Konishi, 2014 g
 Netelia longipalpus Townes 1939
 Netelia maculifemorata (Uchida, 1928) c g
 Netelia nanaki Kaur & Jonathan, 1979 c g
 Netelia nigridorsalis Konishi, 2014 g
 Netelia nodai Konishi, 2014 g
 Netelia pallescens (Schmiedeknecht, 1910) c g
 Netelia rogersi Townes, 1939 c g b
 Netelia sinus Townes, 1939 c g b
 Netelia uncata Townes, 1939 c g b
 Netelia virgata (Geoffroy, 1785) c g
 Netelia yakushimensis Konishi, 2014 g
 Netelia yamatoensis (Uchida, 1934) c g

Subgenus Longiterebates 
 Netelia auberti Kaur & Jonathan, 1979 c g
 Netelia grandis Kaur & Jonathan, 1979 c g
 Netelia himalayensis Kaur & Jonathan, 1976 c g
 Netelia interstitialis (Cameron, 1899) c g
 Netelia longitibiata Lee & Cha, 1996 c g
 Netelia reclivousa Kaur & Jonathan, 1979 c g
 Netelia turgida Kaur & Jonathan, 1979 c g

Subgenus Monomacrodon 
 Netelia bicolor (Cushman, 1934) c
 Netelia elumbis (Tosquinet, 1903) c g

Subgenus Netelia 
 Netelia aberrans Townes, Townes & Gupta, 1961 c g
 Netelia acuminata Townes, 1939 c g b
 Netelia aequora Kaur & Jonathan, 1979 c g
 Netelia aethiopica (Szepligeti, 1907) c
 Netelia affinis Townes, 1939 c g b
 Netelia alpina (Rudow, 1886) c
 Netelia amamiensis Konishi, 2005 c g
 Netelia antipodum (Vachal, 1907) c g
 Netelia appendiculata (Provancher, 1874) c g b
 Netelia areator (Schiodte, 1839) c g
 Netelia areoleta Nikam & Rao, 1972 c g
 Netelia armeniaca Tolkanitz, 1971 c g
 Netelia aspera (Enderlein, 1912) c g
 Netelia atlantor Aubert, 1971 c g
 Netelia arabs (Strand, 1911) c g
 Netelia atra Tolkanitz, 1999 c g
 Netelia basirufa (Strand, 1911) c g
 Netelia blantoni Townes, 1939 c g b
 Netelia brasiliensis (Szepligeti, 1906) c
 Netelia brevicornis (Cushman, 1924) c b
 Netelia brunnea Townes, 1939 c g b
 Netelia californica (Cushman, 1924) c g b
 Netelia calva Townes, 1939 c g b
 Netelia capensis (Holmgren, 1868) c g
 Netelia carmichaeli Kaur & Jonathan, 1979 c g
 Netelia cascadica Townes, 1939 c g b
 Netelia caudata Townes, 1939 c g b
 Netelia celebensis (Szepligeti, 1906) c
 Netelia ceylonica (Cameron, 1897) c
 Netelia chloris (Olivier, 1811) c g b
 Netelia cockerelli (Cushman, 1924) c g b
 Netelia columbiana (Enderlein, 1912) c g
 Netelia constricta (Morley, 1913) c g
 Netelia contraria (Morley, 1913) c g
 Netelia coriaria (Enderlein, 1912) c g
 Netelia corrugata Kaur & Jonathan, 1979 c g
 Netelia cushmani Townes, 1939 c g b
 Netelia delicata Townes, 1939 c g b
 Netelia densa Townes, 1939 c g b
 Netelia denticulator Aubert, 1969 c g
 Netelia dilatata (Thomson, 1888) c g
 Netelia dimidiata (Morley, 1913) c
 Netelia dolabra Kaur & Jonathan, 1979 c g
 Netelia ehilis (Cheesman, 1936) c g
 Netelia emorsa Townes, 1939 c g b
 Netelia ephippiata (Smith, 1876) c g
 Netelia errans (Tosquinet, 1896) c g
 Netelia exareolata (Meyer, 1933) c g
 Netelia facialis Kaur & Jonathan, 1979 c g
 Netelia falcata Townes, 1939 c g b
 Netelia felix (Strand, 1911) c g
 Netelia fijiensis (Brues, 1922) c g
 Netelia flavitarsis (Enderlein, 1912) c g
 Netelia formosana (Matsumura, 1912) c g
 Netelia fractivena (Enderlein, 1912) c g
 Netelia fulvator Delrio, 1971 c g
 Netelia fumosa Kaur & Jonathan, 1979 c g
 Netelia fuscicarpus (Kokujev, 1899)
 Netelia fuscicornis (Holmgren, 1860) c g
 Netelia gerlingi (Schrottky, 1902) c g
 Netelia gigantia Nikam, 1973 c g
 Netelia gotoi Konishi, 2005 c g
 Netelia gracilis (Morley, 1913) c g
 Netelia grumi (Kokujev, 1906)
 Netelia herero (Enderlein, 1914) c
 Netelia heroica Townes, 1939 c g b
 Netelia idioctenus Townes, 1939 c g b
 Netelia ignota (Morley, 1913) c g
 Netelia imitatrix Kaur & Jonathan, 1979 c g
 Netelia incommunis (Szepligeti, 1906) c g
 Netelia indica (Rao & Grover, 1960) c
 Netelia indicata Gupta, 1987 c g
 Netelia inepta Townes, 1939 c g b
 Netelia infractor Delrio, 1971 c g
 Netelia ingrata Townes, 1939 c g b
 Netelia insulicola (Morley, 1913) c g
 Netelia intermedia (Cameron, 1905) c g
 Netelia kashmirensis (Cameron, 1906) c g
 Netelia kusigematii Konishi, 2005 c g
 Netelia kyushuensis Konishi, 2005 c g
 Netelia lativectis Townes, 1939 c g b
 Netelia leo (Cushman, 1924) c g b
 Netelia levisulca Kaur & Jonathan, 1979 c g
 Netelia ligata Townes, 1939 c g b
 Netelia lineata (Brulle, 1846) c
 Netelia liopleuris (Szepligeti, 1906) c g
 Netelia lobata Townes, 1973 c g
 Netelia lucens Townes, 1939 c g b
 Netelia lucidula (Szepligeti, 1906) c g
 Netelia luteola (Tosquinet, 1896) c
 Netelia luteostigma (Strand, 1911) c g
 Netelia macra Townes, 1939 c g b
 Netelia madagascariensis (Enderlein, 1912) c
 Netelia media (Ashmead, 1894) c g
 Netelia melanogaster (Cameron, 1906) c g
 Netelia melanopus (Brulle, 1846) c g
 Netelia melanostigma (Cameron, 1886) c
 Netelia melanura (Thomson, 1888) c g
 Netelia meridionator Aubert, 1960 c g
 Netelia microdon Townes, 1939 c g b
 Netelia microtylus Townes, 1939 c g b
 Netelia mirabilis Kaur & Jonathan, 1979 c g
 Netelia mombasica (Strand, 1911) c g
 Netelia morleyi Townes, Townes & Gupta, 1962 c g
 Netelia moschiana (Strand, 1911) c g
 Netelia mustela Townes, 1939 c g b
 Netelia nanutor Aubert & Shaumar, 1978 c g
 Netelia natalensis (Cameron, 1911) c g
 Netelia neotropica (Brethes, 1927) c g
 Netelia nigricornis Horstmann, 1981 c g
 Netelia nigrinota (Uchida, 1928) c g
 Netelia nigripectus (Ashmead, 1890) c g b
 Netelia nigritarsalis Konishi, 2005 c g
 Netelia nigriventris (Brulle, 1846) c g
 Netelia nigroeandis (Cameron, 1911) c g
 Netelia nigrostigma (Strand, 1911) c g
 Netelia nitida Townes, 1939 c g b
 Netelia nodulosa (Morley, 1913) c g
 Netelia nomurai Konishi, 2005 c g
 Netelia nubigenus (Roman, 1924) c
 Netelia nyassica (Strand, 1911) c g
 Netelia obliquetransversalis (Enderlein, 1912) c g
 Netelia obrepta Townes, 1939 c g b
 Netelia ocellaris (Thomson, 1888) c g
 Netelia ocellata (Viereck, 1909) c b
 Netelia ocelliger (Strand, 1915) c g
 Netelia oeceticola (Blanchard, 1941) c
 Netelia oharai Konishi, 2005 c g
 Netelia opacula (Thomson, 1888) c g
 Netelia orba Townes, 1939 c g b
 Netelia orientalis (Cameron, 1905) c g
 Netelia ovalis Townes, 1939 c g b
 Netelia pallens (Cushman, 1924) c g b
 Netelia pallida (Tosquinet, 1896) c g
 Netelia pallidilutea (Strand, 1911) c g
 Netelia palpalis Townes, 1939 c g b
 Netelia parca Kaur & Jonathan, 1979 c g
 Netelia paramelanura Tolkanitz, 1981 c g
 Netelia pardalis (Cushman, 1924) c g b
 Netelia parva (Szépligeti, 1908) c
 Netelia parviareolata (Enderlein, 1912) c g
 Netelia pectinia Kaur & Jonathan, 1979 c g
 Netelia pengalengana (Enderlein, 1912) c g
 Netelia percurrens Townes, 1939 c g b
 Netelia perforata (Schulz, 1906) c g
 Netelia planipes (Tosquinet, 1896) c g
 Netelia platypes (Cushman, 1930) c b
 Netelia pluridens Townes, 1939 c g b
 Netelia praevalvator Delrio, 1971 c g
 Netelia producta (Brulle, 1846) c g
 Netelia punctata Townes, 1939 c g b
 Netelia radialis (Morley, 1916) c g
 Netelia rapida Tolkanitz, 1981 c g
 Netelia recta Townes, 1939 c g b
 Netelia rectifascia Townes, 1939 c g b
 Netelia rectivena (Enderlein, 1912) c g
 Netelia reflexa Townes, 1939 c g b
 Netelia rimosa (Enderlein, 1912) c g
 Netelia rotunda Kaur & Jonathan, 1979 c g
 Netelia rufa (Brulle, 1846) c
 Netelia rufescens (Tosquinet, 1896) c
 Netelia rufoculata (Strand, 1911) c g
 Netelia rugosa (Cushman, 1924) c
 Netelia rukmaniae Kaur & Jonathan, 1979 c g
 Netelia sayi (Cushman, 1924) c g b
 Netelia scissulata (Enderlein, 1912) c g
 Netelia semenowi (Kokujev, 1899) c g
 Netelia semirufa (Holmgren, 1868) c g
 Netelia setosa Kaur & Jonathan, 1979 c g
 Netelia shopar Cheesman, 1953 c g
 Netelia silantjewi (Kokujev, 1899) c g
 Netelia siva Kaur & Jonathan, 1979 c g
 Netelia solus Townes, 1958 c g
 Netelia spinipes (Cushman, 1924) c g b
 Netelia stigmata Townes, 1939 c g b
 Netelia striata Nikam, 1973 c g
 Netelia strigata (Enderlein, 1912) c g
 Netelia strigilobus Townes, 1939 c g b
 Netelia subfusca (Cresson, 1865) c
 Netelia szepligetii (Schulz, 1907) c g
 Netelia takaozana (Uchida, 1928) c g
 Netelia tamis (Cheesman, 1936) c g
 Netelia terebrica Nikam, 1973 c g
 Netelia testacea (Gravenhorst, 1829) c g
 Netelia testaceinervis (Cameron, 1912) c g
 Netelia thoracica (Woldstedt, 1880) c g
 Netelia tinctipennis (Cameron, 1886) c
 Netelia togoana (Strand, 1911) c g
 Netelia townesi (Uchida, 1940) c b
 Netelia townsendi (Cushman, 1924) c g b
 Netelia trituberculata (Cushman, 1924) c g b
 Netelia truncativenosa (Enderlein, 1912) c g
 Netelia turbans Townes, 1939 c g b
 Netelia umbone Townes, 1939 c g b
 Netelia unguicularis (Cushman, 1924) c g b
 Netelia unicolor (Smith, 1874) c g
 Netelia valvator Aubert, 1968
 Netelia vegeta Tolkanitz, 1981 c g
 Netelia veronesii Blanchard, 1960 c g
 Netelia vinulae (Scopoli, 1763) c g
 Netelia woris (Cheesman, 1936) c g

Subgenus Parabates 
 Netelia foersteri Kaur & Jonathan, 1979 c g
 Netelia fusca Konishi, 1985 c g
 Netelia fusciapicalis Pham, Chen & Konishi, 2021
 Netelia ishiharai Uchida, 1953 c g
 Netelia johnsoni (Ashmead, 1900) c g b
 †Netelia memorialis (Brues, 1910) c g
 Netelia nigricarpa (Thomson, 1888) c g

Subgenus Paropheltes 
 Netelia albipicta (Tosquinet, 1896) c
 Netelia alaskensis (Ashmead, 1902) c g b
 Netelia albovariegata (Provancher, 1874) c g b
 Netelia arabator Delrio, 1971 c g
 Netelia arcanus Tolkanitz, 1980 c g
 Netelia barberi (Cushman, 1924) c g b
 Netelia basilewskyi Benoit, 1955 c g
 Netelia beschkovi Kolarov, 1994 c g
 Netelia caucasica (Kokujev, 1899) c g
 Netelia ciliata Townes, 1939 c g b
 Netelia contiguator Delrio, 1975 c g
 Netelia decorator (Seyrig, 1927) c g
 Netelia dhruvi Kaur & Jonathan, 1979 c g
 Netelia elegans (Szepligeti, 1905) c g
 Netelia elevator Aubert, 1971 c g
 Netelia ermolenkoi Tolkanitz, 1981 c g
 Netelia flavolineata (Cameron, 1907) c
 Netelia fulginosa Konishi, 1996 c g
 Netelia guptai Kaur & Jonathan, 1979 c g
 Netelia hottentota (Strand, 1911) c g
 Netelia incognitor Delrio, 1971 c g
 Netelia inedita (Kokujev, 1899)
 Netelia interstitinervis (Strand, 1911) c g
 Netelia laticeps Townes, 1939 c g b
 Netelia lineolata (Costa, 1883) c g
 Netelia longipes (Brauns, 1889) c g
 Netelia macroglossa Townes, 1939 c g b
 Netelia maculiventris (Kokujev, 1915) c g
 Netelia millieratae (Kriechbaumer, 1897) c g
 Netelia nervulator Aubert, 1971 c g
 Netelia nomas (Kokujev, 1899) c g
 Netelia novoguineensis (Szepligeti, 1906) c
 Netelia ornata (Vollenhoven, 1873) c g
 Netelia parvula (Meyer, 1927) c
 Netelia pharaonum (Schmiedeknecht, 1910) c g
 Netelia picta Townes, 1939 c g b
 Netelia radiata Townes, 1939 c g b
 Netelia rimata Townes, 1939 c g b
 Netelia savchenkoi Tolkanitz, 1981 c g
 Netelia serrata Townes, 1939 c g b
 Netelia sikkimensis Kaur & Jonathan, 1979 c g
 Netelia strigosa Konishi, 1996 c g
 Netelia tarsata (Brischke, 1880) c g b
 Netelia terebrator (Ulbricht, 1922) c g
 Netelia thomsonii (Brauns, 1889) c g
 Netelia turanica (Kokujev, 1899) c g
 Netelia yui Konishi, 2000 c g
 Netelia zaydamensis (Kokujev, 1915) c

 Subgenus Prosthodocis 
 Netelia aestiva Konishi, 1991 c g
 Netelia antefurcalis (Szépligeti, 1908) c g
 Netelia australis Konishi, 1991 c g
 Netelia baibarensis (Uchida, 1928) c
 Netelia borealis Konishi, 1991 c g
 Netelia exserta (Cushman, 1924) c g b
 Netelia hikosana Konishi, 1991 c g
 Netelia japonica (Uchida, 1928) c g
 Netelia kodai Konishi, 1991 c g
 Netelia major Konishi, 1991 c g
 Netelia scabiosa (Enderlein, 1912) c g
 Netelia sobaekensis Lee & Cha, 1996 c g
 Netelia uchidai Kaur & Jonathan, 1979 c g
 Netelia whymperi (Cameron, 1903) c g

 Subgenus Protonetelia 
 Netelia hirashimai Konishi, 1986 c g
 Netelia tadauchii  Konishi, 2012

 Subgenus Toxochiloides 
 Netelia hayashii Konishi, 1996 c g
 Netelia krishtali Tolkanitz, 1971 c g
 Netelia latro (Holmgren, 1868) c g
 Netelia punctator Delrio, 1971 c g
 Netelia tunetana (Habermehl, 1923) c

 Subgenus Toxochilus 
 Netelia caviverticalis (Cushman, 1924) c g b
 Netelia clypeata (Cushman, 1924) c b
 Netelia glabra Townes, 1939 c g b
 Netelia magniceps Townes, 1939 c g b
 Netelia mystace Townes, 1939 c g b
 Netelia pulchra (Cushman, 1924) c b
 Netelia ultima'' Townes, 1939 c g b

Data sources: i = ITIS, c = Catalogue of Life, g = GBIF, b = Bugguide.net

References

Further reading 

 

Netelia